Sybille Schmidt (born 31 August 1967 in Apolda) is a German rower who competed for the SC Dynamo Berlin / Sportvereinigung (SV) Dynamo. She won a gold medal at the 1992 Barcelona Olympics and 3 Gold Medals in the World Championships, beginning with 1989 in Bled, Slovenia for the former East Germany.

References

External links
 

German female rowers
Living people
Olympic medalists in rowing
Olympic gold medalists for Germany
World Rowing Championships medalists for East Germany
World Rowing Championships medalists for Germany
Olympic rowers of Germany
Rowers at the 1992 Summer Olympics
People from Apolda
1967 births
Medalists at the 1992 Summer Olympics
Sportspeople from Thuringia
20th-century German women
21st-century German women